This Is Normal is the third studio album by Icelandic electronic music band GusGus. It was released on 26 April 1999 on 4AD.

Reception

AllMusic called This Is Normal "a fine blend of accessibility and invention".

Track listing

Charts

References

1999 albums
GusGus albums